William Alexander Paterson (born 23 February 1948) known professionally as Bill Alexander is a British theatre director who is best known for his work with the Royal Shakespeare Company and as artistic director of Birmingham Repertory Theatre. He currently works as a freelance, internationally as a theatre director and most recently as a director of BBC Radio 4 drama.

Early years
William Alexander Paterson was born in Hunstanton, Norfolk, England, on 23 February 1948 to William and Rosemary Paterson (née McCormack). He was a boarder at St. Lawrence College, Ramsgate, Kent before going on to Keele University (1969–1973) where he studied English and founded an experimental theatre group called Guerilla Theatre based on the principles of the Polish theatre director Jerzy Grotowski.

Early career
In 1974, Alexander began his career as a Trainee Director at the Bristol Old Vic. His productions included Butley by Simon Gray, How the Other Half Loves by Alan Ayckbourn, Shakespeare's Twelfth Night, Blythe Spirit by Noël Coward. In 1975 he joined the Royal Court Theatre as an assistant director.  His production of Class Enemy by Nigel Williams won the Binkie Beaumont Award for Best New Director.

At the Royal Shakespeare Company

Alexander joined the RSC in 1977 as assistant to Trevor Nunn and John Barton. Initially, he worked in the RSC's two studio theatres: The Warehouse in London (primarily devoted to new plays) and The Other Place in Stratford (dedicated to a mixture of new plays and the re-discovery of classics by performing them on a small scale). He also worked at The Pit studio space which replaced The Warehouse when the RSC moved to the Barbican.

In 14 years at the RSC, Alexander's studio productions included Factory Birds by James Robson (Warehouse), Captain Swing by Peter Whelan (TOP), Tartuffe by Molière (PIT), Volpone by Ben Jonson (TOP and PIT), The Accrington Pals by Peter Whelan (Warehouse), Cymbeline by William Shakespeare (TOP and PIT) with Harriet Walter as Imogen.

Alexander's first production on the RSC main stage was Richard III (with Antony Sher as Richard) in 1984. This production, for which Anthony Sher won the Olivier Award for Best Actor later transferred to the Barbican.

In 1980 he directed Harold Pinter's Betrayal at the Cameri Theatre, Tel Aviv.

In 1986, Alexander's production of The Merry Wives of Windsor won him the Laurence Olivier Award for Best Director. In 2014, Michael Billington, the Guardian's theatre critic chose this production as one of his 'Best'.

Alexander's other productions for the RSC included A Midsummer Nights Dream (1986) with Sean Bean as Robin Starveling, Twelfth Night with Harriet Walter as Viola, and Deborah Findlay as Olivia 1987/88,The Merchant of Venice with Antony Sher as Shylock in 1987, Cymbeline with David Bradley and Harriet Walter in 1998, Much Ado About Nothing in 1991, The Taming of the Shrew in 1992, and Titus Andronicus in 2003. About the latter Alexander said,"I've also discovered what I like about Titus: it's the best play about revenge that I can think of. Revenge is such a difficult idea to deal with. Everyone knows it's "a bad thing", yet everyone understands the phrase "revenge is sweet". Titus shows revenge's seductiveness, the impulse in us all that the law is there to control. It is a work of lurid genius because it reminds us of the fundamental truths about the role of law in a just society."

Birmingham Repertory Theatre
Alexander left the RSC to become Artistic Director and Chief Executive of the Birmingham Repertory Theatre in 1992. His productions there included:
 1993 Othello
1993  The Snowman adapted from the book by Raymond Briggs
 1993 The Merchant of Venice
 1993 Old Times by Harold Pinter
 1994 The Tempest
 1995 Macbeth with James Purefoy
 1995 The Servant by Robin Maugham
 1995 The Way of the World by William Congreve
 1996 The Alchemist (later transferred to the National Theatre)
 1996Divine Right by Peter Whelan
 1998 Hamlet
 1998 Frozen by Bryony Lavery (later transferred to the National Theatre)
 1999 Nativity by Peter Whelan
 2000 Twelfth Night
 2000 Absurd Person Singular by Alan Ayckbourn

Later work 
Alexander's work since 2000 has included:
 2001 - Theatre Clwyd - An Enemy of the People
 2001 - Northampton Rep - The Importance of Being Earnest
 2002 - National Theatre - Frozen (Bryony Lavery), revival of Alexander’s award-winning production starring Josie Lawrence, Anita Dobson and Tom Georgeson
 2003 - National Theatre - Mappa Mundi (Shelagh Stephenson), world premiere starring Lia Williams and Alun Armstrong
 2004 - RSC - Titus Andronicus starring David Bradley
 2005 - RSC - King Lear starring Corin Redgrave
 2007 - Zurich Ballet -A Midsummer Night's Dream
 2008 - Mark Taper Forum Los Angeles - The School of the Night (Peter Whelan), revival of Alexander's award-winning production for the RSC
 2009 - Nottingham Playhouse - Glamour (Stephen Lowe)
 2011 - The Arts Theatre London - Bette and Joan (Anton Burge)
 2011 – 2015 Productions at LAMDA: Twelfth Night, Summerfolk, Measure for Measure, The Merchant of Venice.
 2012 - NWCTC Portland USA - Othello
 2012 - UK tour - Bette and Joan (Anton Burge)
 2014 – 2015 Summer school for Shakespeare in Italy at University of Urbino.
 2015 BBC Radio4 Classic Serial - The Sea, The Sea (starring Jeremy Irons)
 2015 Production at Bristol Old Vic Theatre School of The Merchant of Venice.
 2017 Bristol Old Vic Theatre School - The Two Gentlemen of Verona
 2017 LAMDA - As You Like It
 2017 voice-over for 50 Years of Fish & Chips
 2018 Bristol Old Vic Theatre School - The Taming of the Shrew
 2020 Shakespeare in Italy - a specialist blog, Shakespeare in the rehearsal room https://www.shakespeareinitaly.org.uk/News-Blog/Blog

Awards 
In 1978, Alexander received the Binkie Beaumont Award for Best New Director and in 1986, the Laurence Olivier Award for Best Director for The Merry Wives of Windsor at the RSC.

Personal life 
In 1977, Alexander married actor and painter Juliet Harmer. They have two daughters and four grandchildren.

References

External links
 Bill Alexander at the Internet off-Broadway Database
 
 DeBrett's
 The Royal Shakespeare Company
 Northwest Classical Theatre Company

1948 births
Living people
Laurence Olivier Award winners
British theatre directors
People from Hunstanton